Roman Mrugała (28 February 1918 – 25 March 1987) was a Polish footballer. He played in two matches for the Poland national football team in 1938.

References

External links
 

1918 births
1987 deaths
Polish footballers
Poland international footballers
Place of birth missing
Association footballers not categorized by position